This is a list of human-powered aircraft by date.

See also
History of human-powered aircraft

References

Further reading

External links

 Chris Roper's online book Human Powered Flying
 Prop designer

 Vélair
 – Yuri human-powered helicopter – YouTube video
 – human-powered ornithopter
 – Snowbird
 – video of first flight for the Snowbird
 – Gamera human-powered helicopter
:de:HV-1 Mufli
 – Snowbird
 – Coolthrust Japan
 – Snowbird

 – Gossamer Condor
 – Mozi video
 – Mozi drawings, photos etc.
 – Mozi article

Lists of aircraft by power source